This is a list of Special Operations Executive operations in World War II.

Albania
 Bernard (1943)  – Albania, partisan support
 Cameron (194?)  – Albania, partisan support
 Consensus (194?)  – Albania, partisan support
 Consensus II (194?)  – Albania, partisan support
 Cooperation (194?)  – Albania, partisan support
 Figure (194?)  – Albania, partisan support
 Gunman (194?)  – Albania, partisan support
 Primus (194?)  – Albania, partisan support
 Sapling (194?)  – Albania, partisan support
 Sconce (194?)  – Albania, partisan support
 Sculptor (194?)  – Albania, partisan support
 Slender (194?)  – Albania, partisan support
 Spillway (194?)  – Albania, partisan support
 Spinster (194?)  – Albania, partisan support
 Stables (194?)  – Albania, partisan support
 Stepmother (194?)  – Albania, partisan support
 Swifter (194?)  – Albania, partisan support
 Vertebrae (194?)  – Albania, partisan support

Austria
 Operation Bongo (1945)  – Austria, Operation to secure a vault containing many of Europe's art treasures.
 Clowder (1943–45)  – Austria, establishment of an advance post to make contacts in central and eastern Europe, exploiting resistance movements, and looking especially to work in Austria and Germany.
 Crowd (1945)  – Austria, 16 March investigation of general conditions of the underground socialist movement in the Sudetenland; fate unknown but thought to have been captured.
 Danbury (1945)  – Austria, 13 August sabotage of enemy lines of communication in Drau valley, based at Klagenfurt; eventually returned to Bari.
 Operation Denver (1944)  – Austria, 8 May contact with resistance groups in Sudetenland and establishment of communications. All agents lost through betrayal.
 Drybrook (1945)  – Austria, 13 August establishment of W/T links in east Tyrol; dropped in error to Germany and returned to UK.
 Duncery (1945)  – Austria, 24 April preservation of Zeltweg Aerodrome for the Allies, in the event unnecessary through work of local anti-Nazi groups.
 Duval (1945)  – Austria, 16 February to contact underground organisation in Salzburg and assist in sabotage; party captured.
 Ebensburg (1945)  – Austria, 8 February organisation of local sabotage with Maquis; capture of Bad Aussee four days before US arrival.
 Electra (1945)  – Austria, 23 March to contact the underground socialist movement, Vienna; W/T contact never established.
 Evansville (1945)  – Austria, 7 February support to movement in Graz, and arrangement for agents in Italy; believed killed and underground organisation crushed.
 Greenleaves (1945)  – Austria, 2 April group based at Klagenfurt; dropped successfully but documents and photos captured; evacuated to Bari.
 Hamster (1945)  – Austria, 21 April arming of small resistance groups for attacks on road and rail transport; reported working in Klagenfurt.
 Haras (1945)  – Austria, 30 July to join Communist underground in Innsbruck, establish radio links. Unsuccessful, W/T not dropped and agent attacked.
 Historian (1945)  – Austria, 24 April attack against communication lines in Klagenfurt.
 Pyx (1945)  – Austria, 13 June Klagenfurt to Vienna; for creation of safe houses, contact with the resistance locally, sabotage organisation; delay imposed by partisans and capture of information; eventually return of the party to Bari.
 Seafront (1945)  – Austria, 12 October establishment of safe route to Salzburg and encouragement of resistance in Salzburg; dropped to Germany by mistake.
 Temple (1945)  – Austria, 13 August establishment of contacts in frontier area; fate unknown.

Belgium
 Aemilius (1944) – Belgium, 3 August 1944, field name Lucie, Rockfort-Marche region.
 Aeneas (1944) – Belgium
 Agamemnon (1944) – Belgium, January/February 1944, field name Suzanne, Tournai, liaison mission with Cufflinks mission, captured.
 Agrippa (1944) – Belgium, 5 March 1944, field name Brooch, W/T mission.
 Alarbus (1944) – Belgium, 3 June 1944, field name Locket, Ciney/Marche region.
 Alcibiades (1944) – Belgium, 5 August 1944, field name Ida, Halle/Nivelles region, provision of instruction in sabotage.
 Alsatian (1943) – Belgium 21–22 April 1943, Briquet. Mission members killed on impact. Aimed at encouragement of resistance in industry.
 Antenor (1944)  – Belgium, field name Tiepin, Gemblaux.
 Apemantus (1944)  – Belgium, February/March field name Monique, Beauriang region, liaison with resistance groups.
 Arboretum (1944) – Belgium, agents executed, few details of exact mission.
 Armadillo (1944)  – Belgium, 6 August field name Gavotte, Ardennes region.
 Association (1941–1942)  – Belgium, infiltration of agent to Belgium through Lisbon; paid off after attempt at usage .
 Aufidius (1944)  – Belgium, 1 April filed name Colette, Ciney Marche, liaison mission with chief of zone IV, for organisation of zone, instruction in arms and explosives.
 Autogyro (1941)  – Belgium, few details in files, mission cancelled after several failures.
 Baboon (1942)  – Belgium, 17 November Political Intelligence Department mission to encourage peasant resistance.
 Badger (1943)  – Belgium, February Liège Province region, reception committees, communication with Secret Army; agent deemed 'irresponsible'.
 Balaklava (1941)  – Belgium, September–October W/T support to Outcaste at Neufchâteau, discovered by Germans.
 Balthazar (1942–1944)  – Belgium, field name Louse, aimed at paralysis of river traffic in Hainaut region, later expanded to cutting of railway routes and destruction of communications in preparation for D-Day, working to Nelly.
 Bassianus (1944)  – Belgium, May field name Violette, to work to Nelly, sabotage instruction, including derailment of trains.
 Bernardo (1944)  – Belgium, 4–5 July Brussels region, messenger to chief of Secret Army, field name Nina.
 Bianca (1944)  – Belgium, 28–29 June field name Diane, sabotage instruction.
 Borzoi (1943)  – Belgium, 20 December 1942, Brussels and Tournai, to extend Flemish clandestine press, reception committees; agents escapes to Geneva, March .
 Brabantio (1944)  – Belgium, July or August filed name Odette, principal delegate to occupied territory for organisation of sabotage.
 Buckhound (1943)  – Belgium, W/T support, Military Zone IV, Brussels.
 Bullfrog (1943)  – Belgium, May field name Bullfrog accompanied by Gofer as a signal officer contacts with Secret Army, organisation of reception committees and sabotage groups South of the river Meuse.
 Caius (1944)  – Belgium, August field name Stephanie, sabotage instruction to Huguette, Brussels and Liège Province region, captured, escaped.
 Calf (1943)  – Belgium, January aimed at the creation of links to secret army, Hainaut, but a possible security breach.
 Calpurnia (1944)  – Belgium, July–August field name Courante, W/T support to Huguette group, Hainaut region.
 Canidus (1944)  – Belgium, June W/T to Delphine mission.
 Canticle (1942)  – Belgium, March with Duncan, Mastiff, Incomparable; courier, and W/T support arrested; later agents reported to have been beheaded.
 Caphis (1944)  – Belgium, January field name Herminie, probably a stage mission, captured.
 Carical (1942–44)  – Belgium, PID mission, based in Liège, Charleroi, Brussels, to destroy records of the Office National de Travail to undermine the use of skilled labour by the German occupiers.
 Cato (1944)  – Belgium, July field name Celeste, to provide a messenger link for communications from the Minister of Finance.
 Cawdor (1944)  – Belgium, February–March field name Roland, accompanied by Necklace, to provide a courier service.
 Cayote (1942)  – Belgium, (?) May for organisation of motor sabotage, Brussels, accompanied by W/T mission Duncan.
 Celeste (1944)  – Belgium, July carrying messages from the Belgian Minister of Finance.
 Chicken (1941)  – Belgium, August field name Tante Caro, creation of organisation based on passive resistance and sabotage in the Antwerp area.
 Chiron (1944)  – Belgium, April field name Sash, W/T mission; arrested.
 Cimber (1944)  – Belgium, August field name Yvonne, transmission of microfilmed messages.
 Civet (1942–44)  – Belgium, also known as mission Stanley, report on strength of secret armies at request of Pierlot.
 Claribel (1941)  – Belgium, March preparations for possible use of Belgium by enemy forces as a springboard for the invasion of Britain.
 Claudius (1943)  – Belgium, July to contact resistance groups - FIL, MNB, Group G, and offer financial support.
 Coal/Turtle (1943)  – Belgium, January abortive mission to steal German fighter aircraft, Brussels.
 Collie (1942)  – Belgium, March mission for SOE and Belgian Sûreté, to contact resistance, organise reception committees; exfiltration of leader of Légion Belge, but caused a subsequent quarrel between SOE and the Belgian government in exile over interrogation of leader of Légion Belge.
 Cominius (1944)  – Belgium, March–April field name Mitten, Huy, Ardennes region, W/T mission.
 Conjugal (1941)  – Belgium, September to organise sabotage and contacts, but captured.
 Cordelet (1943–44)  – Belgium, mission to social and democratic trade unionists, to encourage resistance, and organise a go-slow of Belgian workers in Germany.
 Coriolanus (1944)  – Belgium, April–May field name Handbag, W/T mission.
 Daniel/Marmoset (1942)  – Belgium, January sabotage organisation for Periwig.
 Daranus (1944)  – Belgium, April field name Agnes, investigation of Tybalt/ Claudius mission, information gathering on the efficiency of various groups, re-evaluation of sabotage missions.
 Dingo (1943) (1943–44)  – Belgium, PID mission, to stimulate slow down in production in the industrial areas of Charleroi, possible security breaches by agent.
 Dolabella (1944)  – Belgium, July/August field name Ursule, work in organising reception committees with Simone.
 Donaldbain (1944)  – Belgium, August field name Foxtrot, W/T mission accompanying Odette mission.
 Duncan (1942)  – Belgium, October attempted infiltration of agent to Belgium via Portugal through a staged desertion; contact eventually lost.
 Emelia (1944)  – Belgium, August Mrs Olga Jackson, field name Babette, independent propaganda mission for undermining of morale in Brussels, Ghent, Liège, Antwerp, Charleroi; organisation of prostitution circuit aimed at German officers.
 Enorbarbus (1944)  – Belgium, field name Polka, W/T support to Constantine mission.
 Eros (1944)  – Belgium, August field name Reel, W/T support.
 Euphronius (1944)  – Belgium, May field name Arlette, sabotage instruction to Nelly in field, region Bierene.
 Ferret (1942)  – Belgium, plan to evacuate seven agents from Belgium, including Arboretum, presumed captured by Germans.
 Flaminius (1944)  – Belgium, October 1943, field name Jacqueline, arrested mid-
 Flavius (1943)   – Belgium, -44, field name Bib Red, W/T mission.
 Fortinbras (1943)  – Belgium, field name Bracelet, little detail of mission provided in relevant files.
 Gibbon (1942) (1942)  – Belgium, -44, PWE mission, organisation of carrier pigeon communication systems.
 Glamis (1944)  – Belgium, April field name Josephine, Huy, Andenne region, adjunct to Hotton sabotage group.
 Gratiano (1944)  – Belgium, January, field name Ping Pong, W/T operator for Samoyede II, based Brussels.
 Greyhound (1942)  – Belgium, -45, organisation of escape routes through France to Spain (also known as WOODCHUCK and ANTOINE).
 Griffon (1943)  – Belgium, February field name Genon, sent in with W/T mission Badger to Huy region; 2ième Bureau agent sent to liaise with secret armies, eventually captured and sent to Dachau.
 Guineapig (1943)  – Belgium, October field name Wig, with Flaminius, arrested.
 Gypsy (1942)  – Belgium, September 1941, to organise reception committees, VERMILLION courier routes, arrested (?) May .
 Hecate (1944)  – Belgium, (?) mid-, W/T mission to Huguette group, based in Brussels.
 Hector (World War II) (?)  – Belgium, Hector 2 captured. Otherwise little detail available in the file.
 Helenus (1944)  – Belgium, August field name Jeannine, Brussels, sabotage instructor for Nola.
 Hillcat (1943)  – Belgium, August sent with Tybalt, W/T missioni to Hector group.
 Hireling (1941)  – Belgium, September arrested shortly after landing, escape, investigation by MI5.
 Horatio (1944)  – Belgium, January 1944, field name Glove, Brussels, W/T mission for Hector II and Nelly, arrested May .
 Hortensius (1944)  – Belgium, January 1944, field name Valentine, sabotage of waterways, Wanneberg and Brussels region, arrested in April.
 Iachimo (1944)  – Belgium, field name Noemie, to contact resistance groups of MNB. No clue in files as to success.
 Iago (1944)  – Belgium, January field name Scipio, provision of counter scorch organisation in Antwerp; investigation of security of Hector organisation under recent arrests.
 Imogen (1944)  – Belgium, July/August field name Alice, courier for Odette, successful mission.
 Incomparable (1942)  – Belgium, March PID propaganda mission, to contact and obtain influence in sabotage organisation; no clue in these files as to its fate.
 Independence (1941)  – Belgium, April via Gibraltar; to contact any existing organisations and assess progress, advise on needs. No clue as to outcome.
 Intersection (1942)  – Belgium, January captured shortly afterwards, investigation on use by Germans and possible arrest of other agents.
 Jerboa (1943)  – Belgium, April Ghent, Sûreté mission, to limit industrial production, some sabotage of waterways.
 Junius (1944)  – Belgium, May/June field name Parasol, W/T mission, possibly arrested.
 Koala (1942)  – Belgium, June to stimulate a go-slow action to Beringen coal mines to reduce output, also to prepare sabotage on railways and the Albert Canal.
 Labrador (1943)  – Belgium, January 2ieme mission, to organise reception committees; later doubts as to security.
 Lacquer (1941)  – Belgium, September sent to liaise with Conjugal organisation.
 Lamb (1942)  – Belgium, April/May W/T mission, to the secret army.
 Lavinia (1944)  – Belgium, March/April field name Victorine, organisation mission, sabotage against river traffic and locks.
 Lear (1943)  – Belgium, August to assist Stanley mission in cooperation with the secret army.
 Lemur (1942)  – Belgium, November British officer sent to try to resolveccurrent impasse, to organise reception committees, Ghent region.
 Lepidus (1944)  – Belgium, May field name Waltz, W/T mission with Huguette, eventually captured.
 Ligarius (1944)  – Belgium, June 1944, field name Margot, liaison with Delphine, sabotage training; arrested July .
 Lodovico (1944)  – Belgium, May Namur region, field name Rosalie, sabotage instruction mission.
 Lucullus (1944)  – Belgium, January field name Gauntlet, Nivelles, W/T mission.
 Luculluss (1944)  – Belgium, March field name Jeanette, shot down.
 Lynx (1942)  – Belgium, June Neufchâteau area, W/T mission.
 M 12/Tiber (1945)  – Italy, political and military liaison mission; a sparse file suggests activity in Liguria and Genoa.
 Macduff (1943)  – Belgium, May with Ibex and Seal, to find reception committees for Civer, to act as an adjunct to mission Stanley.
 Majordomo (1942)  – Belgium, January with Mandamus, reports on arrests, including Lacquer agents.
 Man Friday (1942)  – Belgium, January contact existing secret organisations, collect political and propaganda information.
 Mandamus (1942)  – Belgium, January to organise sabotage, passive resistance, arms dumps, possibly crashed after take-off.
 Mandrill (1943)  – Belgium, PID mission to contact Cordier mission for the demoralisation of German support, reception of propaganda, Liège, Brussels, Ghent.
 Manelaus (1943)  – Belgium, October liaison mission to chief of zone 1, field name Berthe.
 Marcius (1943)  – Belgium, February/March field name Necklace, W/T support to chief Osric; presumed arrested.
 Mardian (1944)  – Belgium, July field name Mathilde, to work with Celeste.
 Marmot (1942)  – Belgium, September support to existing sabotage movement in Mons, Scheldt region.
 Mastiff (1942)  – Belgium, March W/T mission with Incomparable; no reports received.
 Menas (1944)  – Belgium, August field name Eugénie, to contact Samoyède II and Stentor organisation.
 Mencrates (1944)  – Belgium, April/May field name Hortense, sabotage mission to Nelly.
 Menenius (1944)  – Belgium, August field name Simone, organisation of reception committees; arrives too late to fulfil mission.
 Messala (1944)  – Belgium, June to regain direction in field of railway dislocation, replace Nelly and organise sabotage structure, field name Huguette.
 Mink (1942)  – Belgium, chief steward in Belgian merchant navy, escaping to form sabotage organisation in Antwerp region and await W/T.
 Mongoose (1942)  – Belgium, June to contact secret armies, arrange reception committees; established but no reports received.
 Montano (1944)  – Belgium, March reports on group G activities, investigation of Yapok, Fabius and Hector II missions, creation of PWE structure and sabotage central Brussels.
 Mouse (1942)  – Belgium, March drops unoccupied France, arrested shortly after landing.
 Mule (1942)  – Belgium, April/May Free French recruit, to organise transport and sabotage in Antwerp.
 Musjid (1941)  – Belgium, September/October contact organisations in east and west Flanders, creation of reception and sabotage organisations, organiser Aboretum, to be dispatched.
 Newsagent (1943)  – Belgium, May with W/T operator Vampire, to organise reception committees and sabotage groups in Antwerp and Limburg.
 Nicanor (1943)  – Belgium, January /February field name Therese, support to chief Belgian organisers.
 Opinion (1941)  – Belgium (?), mission to cultivate contacts in ecclesiastical circles, including the king's entourage.
 Othello (1943)  – Belgium, June mission to organise agricultural resistance, develop clandestine press and the encouragement of the sale of produce direct to the population, thus undermining occupation controls.
 Outcast (1941)  – Belgium, September/October to work also into Luxembourg to contact existing groups or set up new ones, plan sabotage of power stations, industrial targets.
 Outhaul (1941)  – Belgium, set for June did not take place, little information as to purpose in available file.
 Pandarus (1944)  – Belgium, March, field name Cufflinks; to supply 90,000 dollars to secret army and aid building up to wireless network.
 Patroclus (1944)  – Belgium, April/May 1944, with Velutus and Publius, field name Bracelet, works to Osric, Brussels, but arrested June .
 Operation Patron (1944)  – Belgium, 1944, proposed exfiltration of Prince Charles of Belgium, brother of the King; no progress by August .
 Periwig (1941)  – Belgium, (?) sabotage mission, captured by Gestapo (few details in the file).
 Philotus (1943)  – Belgium, August establishment of organisation for reception and distribution of propaganda, attacks against pro-Fascists, and obstruction of work of collaborators.
 Phrynia (1944)  – Belgium, August field name Liliane, to Osric, communications, information and reconnaissance for the chief of the area.
 Platypus (1942)  – Belgium, August with Man Friday, mission with Belgian Sûreté and PWE to influence Belgian industry towards go-slow tactics, collection of economic data; status of mission questioned by 'C'.
 Pointer (1943)  – Belgium, July with Claudius, later W/T to Claudius, contact with escape organisations; but questions over contact with German agents.
 Polonius (1944)  – Belgium, January field name Belt, to Tybalt, north of Nivelles.
 Priam (1944)  – Belgium, May/June field name Hubertine, sabotage instruction mission.
 Publius (1944)  – Belgium, April/May field name Muff, W/T mission to Colette
 Rat/Goat (1943)  – Belgium, April organisation of courier line for escapees and mail.
 Regan (1944)  – Belgium, February field name Lining, W/T mission to Scipio.
 Reynaldo (1944)  – Belgium, August field name Gabrielle, to contact chief of the secret army.
 Rhombold (1941)  – Belgium, October Chevron area, W/T and sabotage.
 Roderigo (1944)  – Belgium, May field name Paulette, sabotage instruction to Nelly organisation, Lessines region.
 Rosencrantz (1944)  – Belgium, September W/T mission, overtaken by Allied advance.
 Sable (1942)  – Belgium, April/May east of Blois, to establish sabotage group near Antwerp, part of mission known as 'the Toughs', to disorganise transport, railways, communications.
 Samoyède (1943)  – Belgium, May PID mission, for pre- and post- liberation work, jamming of German wireless installations, aim of helping Allies from D-Day in use of press, cinema and radio.
 Sempronius (1944)  – Belgium, February/March field name Ernestine, assistance to chief of sabotage, organisation of reception of material, using business cover; no reports received from mission in surviving file.
 Silkmerchant (1941)  – Belgium, May organisation of passive resistance through liberal and social parties, eventually leading to sabotage.
 Socrates (1943–44)  – Belgium, to organise financial aid to resistance organisations.
 Terrier (1942)  – Belgium, March Rochefort area, W/T mission suspicions of possible use of W/T sets by the enemy.
 Tybalt (1942–44)  – Belgium, organisational mission to contact resistance CLAUDIUS groups, secret armies and FIL, the largest sub group in Belgium, and bring these within SOE coordination.
 Union (1944) (1944)  – France, January to investigate Maquis strength, Savone region.
 Varro (1944)  – Belgium, field name Delphine, mission to investigate arrests in Tybalt organisation.
 Vergillia (1944)  – Belgium, February field name Nelly, chief sabotage organisation working to chief of staff, SOE and Belgian Sûreté, with the aim of dislocating rail and road transportation on D-Day.
 Yapok (1944)  – Belgium, February with Montano and Volumnia missions, field name Shoelace; arrested and escaped.

France
 Aloes (1944) – France, 1944, code name for resistance headquarters, Brittany, W/T communications to five departments of Brittany.
 Armada (1943)  – France, November sabotage of Le Creusot electricity power, also transformer stations and fuel depots.
 Bezique/Dressmaker (1943)  – France, sabotage of tanneries at Graulhet (Pau-Toulouse) and Mazamet (Carcassonne); unsuccessful.
 Citronelle (1944)  – France, to assess Maquis Strength, Ardennes region.
 Echalotte (1944)  – France, wireless bases in Moselle and Vosges area to augment existing radio circuits and to provide information to London from rear of German line.
 Eucalyptus (1944)  – France, derived from Union, liaison mission, Vercors. Commander, Major Desmond Longe. 
 Hangman (1942)  – France, sabotage of pylons; training for the operation took place, but no indications are available from the file that the operation took place.
 Housekeeper (1943)  – France, sabotage of canal lock at Lesdains.
 Josephine B (1941)  – France, sabotage of transformer sub station Pessac.
 Pilchard (1942)  – France, sabotage of Matisse works, Versailles, and BREWER Radio Paris at Allouis.
 Sainfoin (1944)  – France, September Pantarlier region, working behind enemy lines in advance of Allies.
 Savanna (1941)  – and France, sabotage of Vannes aerodrome.
 Scullion (1943)  – France, 18 April independent French mission to sabotage Les Telots shale oil refinery.
 Sling (1944)  – France, attack on Paris electricity supplies by systematic destruction of pylons on three main lines; successful.
 Operation Sophie (1943)  – France, June dispatch of assistant to De Gaulle's commissaire for France.

Germany
 Braddock I (1944)  – Germany, dropping of incendiary devices by air for possible use by prisoners of war in an uprising.
 Braddock II (1944)  – Germany, dropping of propaganda information in Germany
 Calvados (1943)  – Germany, attempt to start a sabotage organisation in Hamburg and Bremen, using a German deserter, Kurt Koenig.
 Colan (1945)  – Germany, sabotage of railway between Stuttgart and Heilbronn, reports of success by agents.
 Downend (1944)  – Germany, agent sent to create a sabotage organisation in the Ruhr and Frankfurt area, based on a nucleus of contacts with the ISK.
 Fleckney (1944)  – Germany, -45, establishment of an organiser for sabotage in Breslau region.
 Fordwick (1944)  – Germany, establishment of a line for agents and information between Germany and Denmark.
 Foxley (1944–45)  – Germany, plan to assassinate Hitler pressed by SOE and supported by Duff Cooper. A full implementation and intelligence report was drawn up but was not taken forward; internal arguments against the assassination included the possibility of a resulting Hitler martyr cult; and, when the war would eventually be won, a lessening of the perception that Nazism had been decisively crushed by the Allies. In any event, plans to deal with Hitler's subordinates, including Goebbels, found favour but were not implemented (Operation Little Foxleys).
 Frilford (1944)  – Germany, -45, to sabotage railway track from Hintshingen to Oberlauchringen; reports from agents on success.
 Vivacious (1944–45)  – Germany, agent (2nd Lieutenant Baker Byrne) sent to sabotage the Bruno Hintze precision engineering works in Berlin, active in the production of V2 rocket components. Not successful, but agent managed to return to Britain.

Greece
 Animals (1943)  – Greece, redeployment of Harling personnel to disrupt German communication to western Greece and add credibility to a false plan of invasion there.
 Harling (1942)   – sabotage of the Gorgopotamos viaduct in a joint operation by a British mission and Greek Resistance groups.
 Locksmith (1943)  – attempted sabotage of the Corinth Canal by a four-man team led by Mike Cumberlege.

Italy
 Aileron (1944) – Italy, brief report only available in the files of an agent sent to Siena in March 1944, purpose unclear.
 Almouth (1944) – Italy, February 1944, plans for blowing up of railway bridge over the Taro; the relevant file provides few clues to outcome.
 Ampthill (1944) – Italy, March 1944, rail sabotage at Pedaso.
 Atlow (1944)  – Italy, April sabotage against railways in the Siena area, Asciano.
 Balloonet (1944–1945)  – Italy, political and military mission to the East Tyrol and VIOLET south-west Carinthia.
 Bandon VII (1945)  – Italy, continued political and military liaison mission in Turin. Appears to have had the task of facilitating supplies by safeguarding Rivoli airport.
 Bergenfield (1944–1945)  – Italy, political and military liaison mission to the TABELLA partisans, Udine area.
 Blundell (1944)  – Italy, political and military liaison mission to VIOLET Piacenza partisans, working in La Spezia region. The relevant files contain reports by leaders Captain T D Gregg and Major Lett.
 Blundell (1944–1945)  – Italy, general name used to denote the various liaison missions to the Italian partisans in the north, .
 Boykin (1945)  – Italy, plan for kidnapping of suspected double agents who were thought to be compromising the north Italian resistance. Although successful when carried out in February: interrogation of the agents later suggested that the suspicions were unfounded.
 Cherokee (1944–45)  – Italy, political and military liaison mission to partisans in ANTI-SCORCH northern Piedmont.
 Cisco (1945)  – Italy, political and military liaison mission, Modena-Reggio, aiming to create a secure base on the northern Apennine mountains.
 Colossus (1941)  – Italy, February Landing of sabotage of bridges.
 Coolant (1944–45)  – Italy, political and military liaison mission to the partisans COOLANT BLUE north east of Udine.
 Corona (1944) (1944–45)  – Italy, political and military liaison mission, Piedmont.
 Donum (1944–45)  – Italy, political and military liaison mission in east Piedmont.
 Envelope (1945)  – Italy Reggio Emilia region, political and military liaison BLUE (TOFFEE) mission.
 Evaporate (1945)  – Italy, political and military liaison mission to Modena.
 Ferret(1944)    – Italy, June to land three A Force agents north of Bonassola on the Ligurian coast and attempt a meeting with an existing Ferret party.
 Ferrula (1944)  – Italy, -45, Val d'Aosta, political and military liaison mission.
 Flap/Fin (1944)  – Italy, 1945, political and military liaison mission to southern Piedmont, dispatched August. Also appears to be known as Temple mission.
 Floodlight (1944)  – Italy, -45, political and military liaison mission consisting of Major W O Churchill, to act as British Liaison Officer to General Cadorna at the request of the CLNAI in northern Italy.
 Gela Blue (1944)  – Italy, -45, political and military liaison mission to partisans in Vittorio Veneto.
 Genesse (1945)  – Italy, military and political liaison mission to Oltre-Po, Pavese and partisans of Ligurian zone.
 Hail (1944)  – Italy, date uncertain. Few papers are provided on this file, but the mission appears to have been led by Petrucci, shot by the SS in March .
 Hapale (1945)  – Italy, political and military liaison mission to the partisans, southern Piedmont; signals investigation mission.
 Hapeville (1945)  – Italy probably little detail on the file, but likely to have been a liaison mission to the partisans at Bergamasco.
 Harrisburg (1945)  – Italy, political and military liaison mission to partisans
 Herring (1945)  – Italy, April 1944 raid by Italian paratroops on German supply lines.
 Herrington (1945)  – Italy, political and military liaison mission, northern Lombardy, to the partisans of Bergamasco.
 Homestead (1945)  – Italy, political and military liaison mission, northern Lombardy.
 Incisor (1945)  – Italy, political and military liaison mission to the Val d'Aosta area.
 Indelible (1945)  – Italy, military and political liaison mission to partisans in the COTULLA Savona province
 Insulin (1945)  – Italy, March political and military liaison mission, Piacentina area.
 Izarra (?)  – Italy, proposed exfiltration of General Gustvo Pesenti.
 Leyton (1944)  – Italy, July to block enemy transport and communications on the coast road, Fano to Pesaro.
 M 11 (1945)  – Italy, political and military liaison mission, Asti and Piedmont (existed under different leadership before this date).
 M 6 (1944–45)  – Italy, political and military liaison mission in Biella area.
 Mallaby/Neck (1945)  – Italy, 1943 with a second mission the first W/T mission dropped by parachute to Lake Como, but was captured on landing. The agent, Richard Mallaby, also known as Olaf and Richard Tucker, provided a W/T link during the final surrender of the Axis forces in Italy after being captured during his second mission.
 Moselle (1943–45)  – Italy, wireless operation, agent captured in Sardinia and AVOCAT possibly played back against SOE.
 Pool (1944)  – Italy, May. Pool I was a landing on Elba near Capo San Andrea, with Pool II being the exfiltration of agents from the same place.
 Potato (1944)  – Italy, sabotage of the railway line from Siena to Empoli and subsidiary roads, June to July .
 Ricco (1944–45)  – Italy, political and military mission to partisans; road party in the La Spezia area.
 Rudder (?)  – Italy, codename for telegrams received from Rome through a code specially infiltrated immediately after the armistice.
 Ruina (1944–45)  – Italy, political and military liaison mission to partisans, west Veneto. The file contains a detailed sabotage diary.
 Saki (1944–45)  – Italy, political and military liaison mission Liguria region.
 Turdus (1944)  – Italy, Lunese area, political and military liaison mission to partisans.

Netherlands
 Artichoke (1942)  – Holland, June to destroy VLF stations at Kootwijk, the communications centre for U-boats in North Sea. An agent was to be exfiltrated, but the file provides no further details.
 Backgammon/Draughts (1944)  – Holland organising mission, .
 Broadbean (1943)  – Holland, February to collect mail from resistance groups in northern Holland and arrange transportation.
 Curling (1944)  – Holland, W/T mission to chief operator.
 Dicing (1945)  – Holland, (?) April Jedburgh team to represent special forces and act as liaison between resistance and paratroops in the Assen, Meppel and Coevorden area.
 Draughts (1945)  – Holland, January W/T mission, north Holland.
 Gambling (1945)  – Holland, Jedburgh team to Veluwe region.
 Kuyper (1944)  – Holland, October Lieutenant Dubois of Dutch army sent to organise reception committee and locate evading service personnel. Captured.
 Market (1944)  – Holland, September liaison missions for Arnhem operations, EDWARD, provision of W/T contacts with England during airborne operation CLAUDE, Operation Market Garden. The four Jedburgh teams were Edward, Claude, CLARENCE and Clarence and Daniel.
 Rummy (1944)  – Holland, to contact underground movements and report on security aspects after recent German successes against the circuits.
 Tiddleywinks (1944)  – Holland, August to re-establish propaganda links, send messages to the underground press on behalf of the Queen; agent injured on landing.

North Africa
 Falaise (1941)  – Tangier, -42, destruction of an enemy wireless station used for providing locations of Allied submarines in the Straits of Gibraltar.

Norway 
 Barbara (1941) - Trondheim, sabotage train line between Trondheim and Storlien.
 Redshank (1942) - Orkanger, sabotage the transformer station to stop pyrite transportation from Orkla mines to the shipping harbor at Thamshavn.
 Kestral (1942) - Fosdalen, sabotage the iron mine equipment to halt the increase in production.
 Marshfield (1942) - Nesset, sabotage the Rødsand iron mines. SOE agents dispatched but disappeared after landing.

Portugal
 Panicle (1941)  – Portugal, planning for delay of any enemy advance into Portugal.

Spain
 Defiance (1942–43)  – Spain, attempt to build up 'traditionalist', probably Catalan, support in the Barcelona area.
 Hollowshoes (1942)  – Spain, -45, building up of a network by Emilio Varas Canal. The group took its name from the latter's girlfriend who proved her ability to create hollow heeled footwear.
 Periwig (1944–45)  – Spain, a plan for the planting of evidence on captured Germans (who would presumably be allowed to escape) which would lead to the belief that the real German underground resistance movement was being organised from Britain. There is no evidence in the file to suggest that it went ahead.
 Pompey (?)  – Spanish section plan for deception to suggest that the Allies intended to attack southern France or Greek islands.
 Relator (1941–43)  – Spain, name given to the training of a party of area commanders to be used in Spain; also appear to be known as "Ali Baba and the 20 thieves". Their purpose was to delay the enemy in any advance into Spain.
 Reproach (1941–43)  – Spain, general name for attempts to build up support among Spanish 'traditionalists' in the event of an invasion of Spain, in the Navarre area.
 Warden (1941)  – Spain, plan for the sabotage of eight enemy ships in Las Palmas harbour; no evidence that this was carried out.

Sweden
 Bridford (1943–44)  – Blockade running operation smuggling vital war supplies from Sweden to the UK using converted Motor Gun Boats
 Rubble (1941)  – Evacuation of Norwegian flagged ships from Sweden to the UK, transporting vital war supplies.

Yugoslavia
 Bullseye (1941)  – Submarine landing to Montenegrin coast, to contact anti-Axis resistance in Yugoslavia
 Hydra (1943)  – failed contact operation with Josip Broz Tito's Partisans
 Noah's Ark (1943)  – proposed operations to harass German withdrawal from Greece
 Typical (1943)  – The 22 May airdrop of a British delegation to Tito's headquarters.

West Africa
 Postmaster (1942)  – West Africa, capture of two Italian ships.

Miscellaneous
 Bandon (?)  – The files include a report on the HQ in Turin and the liberation of the city.
 Cabaret (1942)  – An attempt to repeat Operation Rubble - abandoned.
 Casement (1944)  – A deception plan aimed at creating the belief that Germans were fleeing to Éire or Argentina to form a free German government. Suggested by the Spanish section during it did not go ahead through the lack of evidence of the Spanish escape connection considered necessary for its success.
 Codford (?)  – Name for all operations designed to prevent enemy states from seizing assets of neutral foreign countries.
 Moonshine (1944)  – Growing out of Operation Bridford, a partially successful operation to deliver arms to the Danish resistance and return via Sweden carrying war supplies.
 Performance (1942)  – An attempt to repeat Operation Rubble - partial success with heavy casualties.
 Rankin (?)  – Codeword for planning of operation in the event of German withdrawal from occupied countries.
 Siamang (?)  – Val Maria area, helping to coordinate anti-scorch measures to protect hydroelectric plants in the region.
 ''Operation Remorse  An economic operation in Hong Kong and other parts of China, that included counterfeiting currency and smuggling, which generated over £77 million in profit for the SOE.

See also
List of World War II military operations

References

Operations
World War II sabotage